Ibrahim I may refer to:

Ibrahim I ibn al-Aghlab (756–812), first Emir of the Aghlabids in Ifriqiya
Ibrahim I ibn Marzuban I ( 957–979), King of Dvin and Azerbaijan
İbrahim I of Karaman ( 1318–1343), bey of Karaman Beylik
Ibrahim I of Shirvan ( 1382–1418), Shah of Shirvan
Ibrahim of the Ottoman Empire (1615–1648), Caliph and Sultan of the Ottoman Empire from 1640 until 1648

See also
Ibrahim II (disambiguation)
Abraham I (disambiguation)
Sultan Ibrahim (disambiguation)